Nieuwenhuizen is a Dutch surname meaning "new houses". A great number of variant forms exist (see the most common form Nieuwenhuis). Notable people with such surname include:

Anneloes Nieuwenhuizen (born 1963), Dutch field hockey defender
Annet Nieuwenhuijzen (1930–2016), Dutch theater and television actress
Antonius van Nieuwenhuizen (1879–1957), Dutch fencer
Cora van Nieuwenhuizen (born 1963), Dutch VVD politician
Dick Nieuwenhuizen (born 1957), Dutch water polo player
 (1819–1892), Dutch colonial administrator in the Dutch East Indies
Jan Nieuwenhuizen (born 1968), Dutch programmer, co-creator of Lilypond
Jan Nieuwenhuyzen (1724–1806), Dutch Mennonite founder of the Maatschappij tot Nut van 't Algemeen
Jörg van Nieuwenhuijzen (born 1978), Dutch football goalkeeper
Kees van Nieuwenhuizen (1884–1981), Dutch footballer
Ludwin Van Nieuwenhuyze (born 1978), Belgian football defender
Peter van Nieuwenhuizen (born 1938), Dutch theoretical physicist, co-discoverer of supergravity
Pieter van Nieuwenhuyzen (born 1971), Dutch competitive sailor
Richard Nieuwenhuizen (1971–2012), Dutchman fatally injured by a youth football team
Tom van den Nieuwenhuijzen (born 1982), Dutch politician
Walter van Nieuwenhuisen (died 1797), Dutch Old Catholic Archbishop of Utrecht
 (1847–1913), Dutch colonel in the Royal Netherlands East Indies Army

See also
Nieuwenhuis, surname of the same origin
Nienhuis, surname of the same origin
Nijenhuis, surname of the same origin

References

Dutch-language surnames
Toponymic surnames